Adil Kaaba (born 19 May 1971) is a Moroccan judoka. He competed in the men's middleweight event at the 1996 Summer Olympics.

References

1971 births
Living people
Moroccan male judoka
Olympic judoka of Morocco
Judoka at the 1996 Summer Olympics
Place of birth missing (living people)
20th-century Moroccan people